The following is a list of notable contestants that have reached the semi-finals or grand final  in Robot Wars.

Series 1
Bodyhammer
Cunning Plan
Recyclopse 
Roadblock
Robot The Bruce
T.R.A.C.I.E

Series 2
Behemoth
Cassius
G.B.H.
Haardvark
Killertron
King Buxton
Mace
Mortis
Napalm 
Panic Attack
Plunderbird 2
Roadblock

Series 3
101
Beast of Bodmin
Big Brother
Blade
Chaos 2
Evil Weevil
Fire Storm
Gravedigger
Hypno-Disc
Mace 2
Panic Attack
Pitbull
Scutter's Revenge
Steg-O-Saw-Us
Thing 2
Trident

Series 4
Chaos 2
Dominator 2
Firestorm 2
Hypno-Disc
MouseTrap
Panic Attack
Pussycat
Spawn of Scutter
Splinter
Steg 2
Stinger
Thermidor 2
Tornado
Wheely Big Cheese
Wild Thing
X-Terminator 2

Series 5
Bigger Brother
Chaos 2
Dominator 2
Firestorm 3
Hypno-Disc
Panic Attack
Pussycat
Razer
S3
Spawn Again
Wheely Big Cheese
Wild Thing

Series 6
13 Black
Bigger Brother
Dantomkia
Dominator 2
Firestorm 4
Hypno-Disc
Razer
S3
Spawn Again
Terrorhurtz
Tornado
Wild Thing 2

Series 7
Atomic
Bulldog Breed
Dantomkia
Firestorm 5
Gravity
M2
Mute
Raging Knightmare
St. Agro
Storm 2
The Grim Reaper
Thermidor 2
Tornado
Tough As Nails
Typhoon 2
X-Terminator

Series 8
Apollo
Carbide
Pulsar
Shockwave
Thor 
TR2

Series 9
Aftershock
Apollo
Carbide
Concussion
Eruption
Ironside 3

Series 10
Behemoth 
Carbide
Eruption
Magnetar
Nuts 2
Rapid

See also
Robot Wars
Robot combat - includes types of robots
BattleBots
Robotica
Robot Fighting League - competitions in the U.S., Canada, and Brazil.
Techno Games
Robot Wars: Arenas of Destruction - Robot Wars video game.

Robot Wars (TV series)